Torre El Pedregal is the tallest building in El Salvador by Mexican architect Ricardo Legorreta, located in Antiguo Cuscatlan. It was built by Grupo Roble.

The construction of urban developments is leading San Salvador to become a modern city. The building was a project f Roble Investment Group, which also built the shopping mall Multiplaza, across the street. The project was built in one of the most important commercial areas of the city. "El Pedregal is aimed at people who want to live in a safe and enjoyable environment", said Alberto Poma, general manager of Roble Group. The tower is part of a multipurpose project to be developed in phases on a total area of seven blocks (excluding the area of Multiplaza). The plan of the project included a five-star hotel, office buildings, apartments, and the existing mall.

See also 
 List of tallest buildings in Central America

References

Buildings and structures in San Salvador
Skyscrapers in El Salvador
Residential skyscrapers
Residential buildings completed in 2009
Ricardo Legorreta buildings